Bouchee or Bouchée may refer to:

 Bouchée à la Reine, a French pastry dish. See Coca (pastry)#Similar recipes along the Mediterranean
 Bouchée, a small pastry case filled with a savory mixture, served as an Hors d'œuvre
 'Une bouchée de', French for 'a mouthful of'. See French articles and determiners#Quantifiers

People with the surname
Ed Bouchee (1933–2013), American baseball player